Farrow, legally known as "Russell A. Farrow Limited.", is one of the largest independently owned customs brokerage in North America. Established in 1911, Farrow now has 29 offices and warehousing locations throughout Canada, the US, Europe and Asia. The firm is a fully integrated customs brokerage and logistics provider specializing in Canadian and US customs clearance, international freight forwarding, warehousing and distribution, ground transportation, and international trade consulting. For over a decade, Farrow has been selected as one of Canada's Best Managed Companies and is a "Platinum Club" member.

Foundation, Growth and Acquisitions
Russell A. Farrow Customs Brokerage, founded in 1911 by Russell Alexander Farrow, transported goods on ferry boats between Canada (Windsor) and the USA (Detroit). Russell A. Farrow’s father, Robinson R. Farrow, was the Commissioner of Canadian Customs.

Russell A. Farrow participated in the founding of the Dominion Chartered Custom House Brokers Association (DCCHBA), also known as the predecessor organization to the Canadian Society of Customs Brokers.

After Russell A. Farrow's death in 1949, the company was passed down to his wife, Alice M. Farrow, and then his two sons, Robinson(Bob) R. Farrow and Huntley J. Farrow. Today the company is owned and operated by Richard J. Farrow, who is the son of Huntley J. Farrow. Richard's brother, John Farrow, is also actively involved in the company, serving as Vice Chairman.

Since Farrow’s establishment in 1911, it has made 22 business acquisitions, including the recent acquisitions of D&H International, All Freight International, W.Pickett and Sons, Cavalier  and CK Logistics, Charles Higgerty Limited and most recently, DJ Powers. Farrow acquired National Logistics services in 2015 and later sold it in 2018.

Services
Farrow provides information management solutions which enable the user to link up electronically with the central databases to enter shipment data for submission and to keep track of import/export activities, in particular TradeSmart Connect, which provides account management, database access, reporting, and auditing capabilities. It offers services such as: customs clearance, entry processing, account management, cross-country coverage, warehousing and distribution, customs consulting, duty recovery programs, compliance verification, and dispute resolution. In addition, Farrow offers door-to-door shipping/LTL, airfreight re-forwarding and delivery, cross-border courier and warehousing services, including Free Trade Zones (FTZ) in select locations, and business-to-consumer and business-to-business merchandising services.

References

See also

 Customs brokerage
 International freight forwarding
 Trade facilitation
 Logistics
 Third-party logistics
 Incoterms
 international trade

Logistics companies of Canada
Logistics companies of the United States
Multinational companies headquartered in Canada
Multinational companies headquartered in the United States
Privately held companies of Canada
Customs duties
Companies based in Windsor, Ontario
Transport companies established in 1911
1911 establishments in Ontario
Canadian companies established in 1911
Customs brokers